Yedi Zahiri (born September 2, 1985 in Paris) is a retired French-born Ivorian footballer, who last played as a midfielder for Terre Sainte.

Career

Early career
Born in Paris, Zahiri received his football education in France, going through the youth ranks of Nîmes, Rouen and Lyon Duchère. A talented youngster, he was selected to play for the Ivory Coast national under-20 football team during the 2005 African Youth Championship, where he also scored a goal against the home nation Benin.

Belgium
To improve his chances of breaking through, he opted to move out of France in 2007, signing with White Star Woluwé in the Belgian Third Division, before being noticed and signed in 2008 by OH Leuven in the Belgian Second Division. At OH Leuven, he never got to show his full potential due to injuries and was told to look for a new club near the end of the 2008–09 season.

Apart from a short spell at White Star Woluwé, Zahiri did not play football between 2009 and 2011 due to some severe injuries. In 2011, he started playing again with FC Pepingen, an amateur team at the fifth level of Belgian football. At Pepingen he stood out often and as a result he was noticed by scouts from third division team Union Saint-Gilloise, signing a contract in 2012.

Gloria Bistrița
In the summer of 2012, he left Saint-Gilloise to sign a contract with Gloria Bistrița where he was given the 16 number shirt.

Notes

External links
Profile at footgoal.net

1985 births
Living people
Ivorian footballers
Nîmes Olympique players
FC Rouen players
Lyon La Duchère players
RWS Bruxelles players
Oud-Heverlee Leuven players
Royale Union Saint-Gilloise players
ACF Gloria Bistrița players
Ivorian expatriate footballers
Ivory Coast under-20 international footballers
Association football midfielders